Andrew Dallalana (born 31 August 1982) is a former Italy international rugby league footballer who played for the Cronulla Sharks in the NRL.

Dallalana attended Endeavour Sports High School and played junior football for Cronulla-Caringbah.

In the 2003 NRL season he made five first-grade appearances as a halfback for Cronulla, as an injury replacement for Brett Kimmorley.

References

External links
Andrew Dallalana at Rugby League project

1982 births
Living people
Australian rugby league players
Italy national rugby league team players
Italian rugby league players
Cronulla-Sutherland Sharks players
Villefranche XIII Aveyron players
Rugby league halfbacks
Rugby league players from Sydney